Agnieszka Machówna (1648–1681), was a Polish con artist and bigamist. Born in the peasantry, she is famous for her fraud in posing as a member of the Zborowski family. Her case was notorious in contemporary Poland.

References

 Krystyna Kolińska. Uroki chłopskiej Wenus . „Stolica”. R. 25, nr 51-52, s. 22-23, 1970.

17th-century Polish people
17th-century Polish women
1681 deaths
1648 births
17th-century criminals
Polish fraudsters
Counterfeiters